Philodendron billietiae [(bi·lli·et·i·ae) pronounced “bili ətiā”)] is a hemi-epiphytic species of plant in the genus Philodendron native to Brazil, Guyana, and French Guiana. A relatively recent discovery in 1995, P. billietiae is known especially for its distinctive orange-yellow petioles and wavy, ridged leaf edges.

History
Philodendron billietiae was first discovered by Frieda Billiet in 1981 in lowland tropical rain-forest in French Guiana. Living material from the plant  was collected and introduced to cultivation in the greenhouses of the National Botanic Garden of Belgium at Meise.

References

External links

billietiae
Plants described in 1995